Sándor Győrffy (born 1966 in Budapest) is a Hungarian handball player who played for the Hungarian national handball team. He participated in the 1992 Summer Olympics, where the Hungarian team placed 7th after beating the Romanian team in the final match.

References

1966 births
Living people
Handball players from Budapest
Hungarian male handball players
Olympic handball players of Hungary
Handball players at the 1992 Summer Olympics